Archery at the 2022 ASEAN Para Games was held at synthetic turf field at the Kota Barat Field in Surakarta, Indonesia.

Originally set to be host by Vietnam in 2021, the Games were initially cancelled due to the COVID-19 pandemic in Vietnam before hosting rights were transferred to Indonesia. It is also originally scheduled from 23 to 30 July 2022, later moved to 30 July to 6 August 2022.

Medal summary

Medal table

Medalists
Recurve

Compound

See also
Archery at the 2021 Southeast Asian Games

References

External links
 Archery Games Result System

2022 ASEAN Para Games
Archery at the ASEAN Para Games
ASEAN Para Games